Hits Radio is a network of 25 contemporary hit radio stations in the United Kingdom, owned and operated by Bauer Media Audio UK.

As of December 2022, the network has a combined reach of 6.6 million weekly listeners according to RAJAR.

Overview
Hits Radio UK broadcasts on DAB in many parts of the UK, nationally on Freeview and Sky TV platforms and online. A localized version of the station airs on FM and DAB in Greater Manchester, and a second localized version airs on DAB in London.

As of 15 June 2020, there are a total of 25 local radio stations in the network, providing local programming, news, traffic and sport, along with networked output from Hits Radio.

The FM network of stations was formerly known as the Big City Network, Bauer Place, Bauer City and Bauer City 1. The national DAB station was formerly known as The Hits.

Most of the stations broadcast under their local identities, such as Clyde 1 in Glasgow and Radio City in Liverpool.

History

The Hits
On 19 January 2015, The Hits formed the backbone of a new locally branded Bauer City 3 network of radio stations in Northern England and Scotland. The local City 3 branding was dropped on 31 August 2017, in favour of adding The Hits to all local DAB Multiplexes.

FM stations networking
Initially known as the Big City Network, and latterly Bauer Place and Bauer City 1, networked programming on Bauer's local FM stations in Northern England and Scotland was initially confined to off-peak night time and weekend timeslots.

Hits Radio rebrand
On 18 April 2018, station owners Bauer announced Key 103 in Manchester would be rebranded and relaunched as Hits Radio Manchester a CHR-led music station aimed at 25-44 year olds on Monday 4 June 2018.

The station was merged with national DAB station The Hits, which in turn was rebranded itself as Hits Radio UK to provide a single national service across the UK on DAB, Freeview and online.

In Manchester, Hits Radio continues to provide local news & information, traffic bulletins and advertising on its local platforms - 103 FM, DAB and online. The station's programming is networked across 24 local FM stations - all of which opt out at times for local output.

In February 2014, the stations adopted a standardised audio identity package, produced by Wisebuddah, while retaining their local station branding. Two networked shows were also introduced across most stations - Old Skool and Anthems and In: Demand - produced from Key 103 in Manchester.

Separate schedules for Northern England and Scotland were introduced in August 2015, followed in July 2017 by two networked mid-morning shows for most of the FM stations, produced from Manchester and Glasgow respectively.

Local weekend programming for most of the English stations was replaced with additional network output in July 2019, followed in September 2019 by the introduction of a networked Drivetime show. The Scottish network of stations introduced a networked Drivetime show at the end of March 2020, except for MFR and Radio Borders.

In February 2017, the Free Radio group of stations in the West Midlands began carrying off-peak programming from the Northern England network, replacing most of its own regional output from Birmingham.

Gem in the East Midlands joined the network in July 2019 to carry late night and overnight programming from Manchester.

Five stations were acquired to join the network, of which four retain heritage branding: Pulse 1 (Bradford), Signal 1 (Stoke-on-Trent), The Wave (Swansea) and Fire Radio (Bournemouth). Pulse, Signal, and The Wave began carrying off-peak programming from the Hits Radio network on 15 June 2020. The fifth, The Breeze (Portsmouth, Southampton and Winchester) rebranded as Hits Radio under a licensing agreement with Nation Broadcasting.

On 20 July 2020, Pulse 1, Signal 1 and The Wave officially joined the Hits Radio network.

On 31 August 2020, Radio Aire ceased broadcasting and moved to the sister Greatest Hits Radio network - it merged with twelve other stations to form Greatest Hits Radio Yorkshire.

The same day saw Hits Radio South Coast launch, thereby becoming the second FM station to be known on air as Hits Radio. The station had previously broadcast as The Breeze South Coast and the change is made following the purchase in 2019 of The Breeze network from Celador Radio. Nation Broadcasting replaced Hits Radio South Coast with their own Easy Radio South Coast programming from 19 September 2022, with Bauer providing Hits Radio content thereafter on the South Hampshire DAB multiplex. 

In October 2020, it was announced that Hits Radio would launch in Suffolk, taking over the DAB capacity which had been used for Greatest Hits Radio since September (previously Town 102), in tandem with the relaunch of Ipswich 102 as Greatest Hits Radio. The change took place on 3 November, at the point Ipswich 102 (and Radio Plymouth) took the GHR affiliation. As in North Yorkshire, a localised feed of Hits Radio is provided, with the ability to split from the network programming content for localised branding, news material and advertising. Hits Radio Suffolk was withdrawn after 1 October 2022, with the capacity reverting to GHR, as a consequence of the FM frequency (the prior Ipswich 102) transitioning to Nation Radio Suffolk. 

In November 2021, Bauer announced the two Free Radio breakfast shows - known as Hits at Breakfast - would be merged into one regional show across all four Free Radio licences. The merger was permitted under OFCOM's local content guidelines, although all four Free Radio licences retain opt-outs for local news, traffic updates and advertising.

In November 2022 it was announced that CFM in Cumbria would follow Radio Aire in transitioning from the Hits Radio network to Greatest Hits Radio, with the change slated to take place as of April 2023; CFM's local weekday show would remain, moved from breakfast to broadcast in an afternoon slot on GHR, with Hits Radio content continuing to be available in the area over DAB - replacing the localised digital-only version of GHR broadcast to Cumbria since the local DAB multiplex began broadcasting in late 2021. Around the same time as announcing the CFM change, Bauer confirmed that two of the relay transmitters of Signal 1 would transfer to carrying GHR from January 2023, with the station's main transmitter area - where GHR broadcasts on AM (formerly Signal 2) - retaining the Hits Network positioning.

In January 2023, Bauer announced that Radio Borders would follow CFM in transitioning from the Hits Radio network to Greatest Hits Radio, in April 2023.

Stations
CFM (due to rebrand to Greatest Hits Radio in April 2023)
Clyde 1
Forth 1
Gem
Hits Radio branded:
Bournemouth and Poole (formerly Fire Radio)
Bristol & The South West (formerly Sam FM)
London - DAB only
Manchester 
North Yorkshire - DAB only
South Coast - DAB only
UK
MFR 
Metro Radio
TFM 
Northsound 1
Pulse 1
Radio Borders (due to rebrand to Greatest Hits Radio on 3 April 2023)
Radio City
Rock FM
Hallam FM
Viking FM
Tay FM
The Wave
West FM
Signal 1
Free Radio branded, Birmingham based studios:
Birmingham
Coventry & Warwickshire
Hereford & Worcestershire
Black Country & Shropshire

Programming
 

Most of the stations broadcast their own local breakfast shows from 6 to 10am each weekday - in most cases, these are produced and broadcast from the originating station's studios.

Network programming for England and Wales originates from Bauer's Castle Quay studios at Castlefield in Manchester. In Scotland, it originates from Bauer's Clydebank studios near Glasgow, and on occasion, from Bauer's Edinburgh studios.

Overnight programming and The UK Chart Show airs across all Hits Radio stations in England, Wales and Scotland from Bauer's Castle Quay studios at Castlefield in Manchester.

Until May 2022 CFM, Gem, MFR, Radio Borders and The Wave opted out of networked scheduling, during weekdays, and weekends respectively. This was replaced by networked programming.

England and Wales variations
Free Radio airs a single regional breakfast show, Hits at Breakfast, across all four of its licence areas.
Hits Radio Bristol & The South West airs a local weekday drivetime show (4-7pm).
Hits Radio Bournemouth and Poole airs a local weekday drivetime show (4-7pm).
Hits Radio in London and North Yorkshire, which are DAB-only stations, carry fully networked programming alongside local news and traffic for their broadcast areas. 
Metro Radio and TFM simulcast Steve & Karen's Breakfast Show on weekdays from 6 to 10am.
Scotland variations
Clyde 1, Forth 1, Northsound 1, Tay FM, West FM, Radio Borders and MFR simulcast a drivetime show with Garry Spence.
Clyde 1's Superscoreboard airs live football commentaries at weekends throughout the season, alongside a nightly magazine show on weekday evenings from 6 to 8pm.
Clyde 1 opts out of Hits Party on Saturday evenings to air an extra edition of The GBXperience from 6 to 10pm.
The Big Saturday Football Show airs on Saturday afternoons (2pm-6pm) on Forth 1, MFR, Northsound 1, Tay FM, West FM and Radio Borders. A local football show air on Clyde 1 (Superscoreboard).
MFR, Tay FM, Radio Borders and West FM air local Saturday breakfast shows (6-9am). Clyde 1, Forth 1, and Northsound 1 simulcast a joint Saturday breakfast show.

News
Bauer's newsrooms across the UK air local news bulletins hourly from 6am to 7pm on weekdays and from 7am to 1pm on Saturdays and Sundays.

Headlines are broadcast on the half-hour during weekday breakfast and drivetime shows, alongside traffic bulletins. National bulletins air on Hits Radio UK.

At weekends, bespoke networked bulletins air from 2pm (until 6pm on Saturdays and 4pm on Sundays) - separate bulletins are produced for England & Wales and for Scotland.

At all other times, mainly evening & overnight, hourly national bulletins originate from Sky News Radio in London.

Notable presenters

Hits Radio Pride

On 29 July 2020, Bauer announced a spinoff pop-up station to Hits Radio, Hits Radio Pride, which launched at 8am on 28 August 2020. The new station would be the first time a major radio broadcaster in the United Kingdom has launched a station that was targeted to the LGBTQ+ community. The service is taking capacity on a select number of Bauer owned ensembles including Northern Ireland, Liverpool, Swansea, Bradford, Stoke and London. Bauer acquired additional DAB capacity as part of the deal to buy Wireless Group's local radio portfolio in 2019.

In Liverpool, Hits Radio Pride took capacity previously used by Radio City Talk. In Northern Ireland the service replaced Magic Chilled.

The station is sponsored by Cooperative Bank for an initial run of 6 months. Additional content is produced by Reform Radio, as part of a grant awarded by the Audio Content Fund. Tough Talks’; is an 'intimate conversations between contributors from the LGBTQ+ community reflecting on the struggles that they face within society.' 

Hits Radio Pride also works with LGBT+ helpline Switchboard (UK) to promote support services.

The station started online and smart speaker test transmissions on 21 August 2020. It consisted of a looped promo featuring tracks from MNEK, Kylie Minogue, Calvin Harris, Kim Petras, Years & Years and Lady Gaga, along with promo trailers. The multiplex variation request submitted to Ofcom suggested the station would arrive on DAB multiplexes from 26 August 2020.

References

External links
 

 
British radio networks
Bauer Radio
Bauer Group (UK)
Radio stations in Manchester
Radio stations established in 2003